Pyramid Island is an uninhabited island in the Rat Islands (Qax̂um tanangis) grouping among the Aleutian Islands. It is a caldera of a former volcano that exploded.

It received its name in 1935 from the crew of the USS Oglala due to its shape.

Doctors Aurel and Arthur Krause, who were in Alaska in 1881-1882 collected at Pyramid Island.

References

Rat Islands
Islands of Unorganized Borough, Alaska
Islands of Alaska
Calderas of Alaska